The Fizeș is a right tributary of the river Someșul Mic in Romania. It discharges into the Someșul Mic in Gherla. Lakes Cătina, Geaca, Sucutard and Țaga are located on the Fizeș. The name in Hungarian means "willow-bed".

References

Rivers of Romania
Rivers of Cluj County